Alburnus orontis, also known as the Orontes bleak or Orontes spotted bleak, is a species of ray-finned fish in the family Cyprinidae, that can be found in Syria and Turkey in the drainage basin of the Orontes River. Its natural habitats are rivers and intermittent rivers. It is threatened by habitat loss, pollution, water abstraction and river damming.

References

orontis
Fish described in 1882
Vulnerable animals
Taxonomy articles created by Polbot